Carman Adam Newcomb (July 1, 1830 – April 6, 1902) was a nineteenth-century politician, lawyer, judge and marshal from Iowa and Missouri.

Life and career

Born in Mercer, Pennsylvania, Newcomb completed preparatory studies and moved to Kentucky. He later moved to Shreveport, Louisiana, where he studied law and was admitted to the bar. He moved again to West Union, Iowa in 1854 and commenced practicing law. He was judge of the circuit court of Fayette County, Iowa, from 1855 to 1860.

At the outbreak of the Civil War, Newcomb served as captain of Company F in the 3rd Iowa Volunteer Infantry Regiment from 1861 until his discharge on account of illness in 1862. He moved to Vineland, Missouri and resumed practicing law. He was a member of the Missouri House of Representatives in 1865 and 1866 and was elected a Republican to the United States House of Representatives in 1866, serving from 1867 to 1869, not being a candidate for renomination in 1868.

Afterward, Newcomb was a United States Marshal for the eastern district of Missouri from 1869 to 1875, was census enumerator of St. Louis, Missouri in 1870 and resumed practicing law.

Death 

Newcomb died in St. Louis on April 6, 1902, aged 71. He was cremated at the Missouri Crematory and his ashes deposited in a columbarium. He was survived by his son, Carman Adam Newcomb, Jr.

Newcomb's living descendants include his granddaughter, American producer and publicist, Patricia Newcomb.

External links
 Retrieved on 2008-02-14

1830 births
1902 deaths
Republican Party members of the Missouri House of Representatives
Iowa state court judges
Iowa lawyers
Missouri lawyers
United States Marshals
Union Army officers
Politicians from St. Louis
Politicians from Shreveport, Louisiana
People from Mercer, Pennsylvania
People from Kentucky
People of Iowa in the American Civil War
Republican Party members of the United States House of Representatives from Missouri
People from West Union, Iowa
19th-century American politicians
Lawyers from St. Louis
19th-century American judges
Military personnel from Pennsylvania